Summil is a village in the Gaza Sub-district of Mandatory Palestine, located  northeast of Gaza. It is situated on a sandy hill on the coastal plain and in 1945 it had 950 inhabitants. became established during the 1948 Arab-Israeli War.

History

Roman period
A marble bust of Pan, dating from the 1st or 2nd century CE, has been found here.

Crusader and Mamluk periods
Summil was founded in 1168 during the Crusades by the Hospitallers for the purpose of protecting the fortress in Bayt Jibrin. There are some remains of the Crusader castle (see photos here), and a medieval masonry well known as Bir Summail survives south of it. Local tradition claims it was named after Samuel, one of the Crusaders who established the village. Under Mamluk rule in the 13th-15th centuries, it was referred to as Barakat al-Khalil ("the blessing of Ibrahim (Abraham)"), because its tax revenues were used by the sultan Barquq to endow the Ibrahimi Mosque in Hebron.

Ottoman period
Summil was incorporated into the Ottoman Empire in 1517 with all of Palestine, and in the 1596 tax records it was part of nahiya (subdistrict) of Gaza under the Gaza Sanjak, with a population of 66 Muslim household, an estimated 363 persons. The villagers paid a fixed tax rate of 33,3% on wheat, barley, fruit, beehives, and goats; a total of 14,500 akçe. All of the revenue went to a waqf.

When Edward Robinson visited Summil in the 1838, he noted that it was a "considerable village on an elevation of the plain." He said that there was a "portion of an ancient wall apparently once belonging to a castle." It was also noted as a Muslim village located in the Gaza district. 

In 1863, French explorer Victor Guérin found the village, which he called Soummeil el-Khalil, to have 400 inhabitants. Some of the houses were built of stone, other of adobe. He further noted a waly, dedicated to a Sheikh Abdallah, which was a well built enclosure built of large stones. An Ottoman village list of about 1870 indicated 50 houses and a population of 133, though the population count included men, only.

In 1882 the PEF's Survey of Western Palestine described Summeil as "a small village on the edge of the higher ground, of mud and stone, with cactus hedges. A pond on the south and a well on the north supply the place. Near the latter there is a pointed archway of good masonry, apparently mediæval work, and there are foundations of hewn stones in the village. [The well] Bir Summeil is south of the village, is also a well-built masonry well, and the place evidently dates back to Crusading times at least." In the late 19th century, Summil had a semi-circular plan.

British Mandate of Palestine
During the British Mandate period, the village expanded toward the southwest and relied on al-Faluja for commercial, medical, and administrative services.

In the 1922 census of Palestine conducted by the British Mandate authorities, Summail had a population of 561 inhabitants, all Muslims, increasing in the 1931 census, to 692, still all Muslims, in 178 houses.

In the 1945 statistics the population of Summeil consisted of 950 Muslims and the total land area was 19,304 dunams, according to an official land and population survey. Of this, a total of 54 dunams were used plantations and irrigable land, 18,720 for cereals, while 31 dunams were built-up areas.

A mosque built on the remnants of a Crusader church was maintained by the Muslim inhabitants. Village houses were built of adobe brick and a school opened in 1936. By the mid-1940s it had an enrollment of 88 students.

1948 and aftermath
Summil was occupied by the Givati Brigade's thrust southward during the period in the 1948 Arab-Israeli War known as the Ten Days between the truces of July 8 and July 18, 1948. During this offensive, Israeli forces managed to occupy a broad swath of territory south of the Jerusalem-Ramla road, displacing over 20,000 people. Although Israeli military accounts later claimed that the inhabitants fled with the approach of Israeli columns, the Haganah spoke of "several cleaning operations" with Summil being one of the villages mentioned. Its inhabitants fled east toward the Hebron area.

On July 19, 1948, an IDF patrol clashed with armed infiltrators at Summil, killing one and wounding another. The patrol warned any refugees they encountered that if any one of them entered "the areas under our control-they would be killed". The day after, on the July 20, the IDF were formally instructed to prevent infiltration to Summil, Barqusya, Bi´lin, Masmiya al Saghira, al-Tina, Kheima, Idnibba, Jilya, Qazaza, and Mughallis. The orders specifically were to "destroy" any "armed force" encountered, and to "expel...unarmed villagers".

The Palestinian historian Walid Khalidi described the village remains in 1992 as: "The remnants of a wall, perhaps one that was built around the village, are still visible. Otherwise, much of the site is overgrown with khubbayza (a wild plant belonging to the mallow family that is cooked as a vegetable in Palestinian peasant cuisine) and grass. There is also a Christ's-thorn trees and dense stands of cactuses; an old cactus-lined village road is visible.
A shanty that houses an Arab family (whose members probably work in one of the Israeli settlements) has been built on the land. The adjacent land is cultivated by Israeli farmers."

Andrew Petersen, who visited in 1994, noted: "The castle appears to be roughly square with a central tower (keep) surrounded by an outer enclosure wall with square corner towers. The principal remains are those of the north enclosure wall which stands to a height of over 8m and is over 30m long and 1,5m thick. The lower part of the wall has a well−preserved glacis.")

See also
Depopulated Palestinian locations in Israel

References

Bibliography

 

 
 
 
 
 No online access to relevant pages.

 

 Summail and Bir Summail (209), p. 97. Describes the remains of the castle and the medieval masonry well (Bir Summail) south of it.

External links

Welcome to Summil
Summil (Gaza), Zochrot
Survey of Western Palestine, Map 20: IAA, Wikimedia commons 
Summil from the Khalil Sakakini Cultural Center

District of Gaza
Arab villages depopulated during the 1948 Arab–Israeli War